City Link was a British next day courier company, operating from 1969 to 2015. It was based in Coventry, West Midlands with offices in other parts of the country. On 24 December 2014, the company entered administration. Ernst & Young (EY) was appointed as the administrator, and immediately ceased accepting parcels from customers. City Link officially ceased trading on 1 January 2015.

History 

City Link was founded in 1969 as a subsidiary of Orbit Cargo Services Ltd, to provide a cross town transfer service for British Rail's Red Star Parcels. At the time, Red Star only operated on direct passenger trains, so a sender in Brighton could not dispatch a parcel to Norwich, as a transfer had to be undertaken in London between Victoria station and Liverpool Street station.

In addition, the Red Star service was limited to station to station only and following increasing demand from its customers, City Link established a nationwide network of franchised agents to collect parcels from the local station and deliver to the consignee. In June 1989, the company was acquired by Securiguard Limited.

On 20 November 2005, Initial City Link announced that as a part of its expansion programme, it would to buy back the franchises. This was completed in March 2007, with the purchase of its largest franchisee, Tiger Haulage Ltd, which ran City Link's Welwyn Garden City, Hemel Hempstead, Barking, Birmingham, Worcester, West Bromwich, Reading and High Wycombe operations.

Acquisition of Target Express 
Exactly one year after Initial City Link announced its franchise buyback scheme, it finished negotiations with the shareholders of Target Express to purchase the company on 20 November 2006. Target was officially acquired, and taken over by Initial City Link on 1 March 2007.

As a part of its merger with Target Express, City Link was planning to close 42 of the 110 combined branches in the first half of 2008, to provide a single integrated network. However, at the end of February 2008, managing director Petar Cvetkovic announced a suspension of further integration of Target Express depots until January 2009.

The merger of the two units proved problematic, particularly due to depots running different computer systems, damaging profits at parent company Rentokil Initial. Rentokil turned down several offers for the loss making unit in May 2008, instead intending to turn around City Link's fortunes.

By November 2011, City Link was still losing money, annual figures released in July show losses growing to £17.8 million, and revenues down 13.5%, and a November 2011 trading statement stated losses of £25 million in the first nine months. Rentokil Initial sold the business to corporate restructuring firm Better Capital in April 2013.

Administration 
Late on 24 December 2014, City Link went into administration, and stopped accepting parcels, whilst its administrators Ernst & Young carried out an assessment of the company.

On 25 December 2014, the RMT union was reported to have demanded "urgent talks" with the government and administrators about the collapse of the company. The government said it was unable to intervene in the administration process, although the business secretary said he would meet the union. RMT demanded government talks over the collapse.

On 31 December, the company announced that 2,356 jobs would be lost, leaving only 370 staff employed. The collapse of City Link also left 1,500 self employed drivers out of pocket, with no recourse or protection. A petition was created by the sub contractors to try to get the collapse of City Link debated in the House of Commons.

Rescue offer rejected 
BBC News reported on 31 December 2014 that the administrators had rejected an offer from an unnamed consortium, claiming that the possible buyer "offered no money up front and significantly undervalued the assets to be acquired". After confirmation that the rescue had failed, Mick Cash, general secretary of the RMT union, said: "Pulling the plug on any efforts to save City Link is a disgraceful and cynical betrayal that will wreck the lives of our members, many of whom are owed thousands of pounds".

Reports 
The Telegraph website reported on 21 March 2015 that "City Link’s creditors are likely to see less than 2p in the pound on any money they are owed". MPs were expected to publish a report on the impact of City Link's closure on employment on 23 March 2015.

References

External links 
 (Archive copy)

Express mail
Logistics companies of the United Kingdom
Companies based in Coventry
Companies that have entered administration in the United Kingdom
British companies established in 1969
Transport companies established in 1969
1969 establishments in England